Pimelea pelinos is a species of flowering plant in the family Thymelaeaceae and is endemic to a small area in the southwest of Western Australia. It is an erect, straggling shrub with narrowly egg-shaped leaves, the narrower end towards the base, and erect clusters of cream-coloured, unisexual flowers surrounded by 2 or 4 egg-shaped, leaf-like involucral bracts.

Description
The flowers are cream-coloured and densely hairy on the outside. Flowering occurs in June and July.

Taxonomy
Pimelea pelinos was first formally described in 1989 by Barbara Lynette Rye and the description was published in the journal Nuytsia from specimens collected east of Scaddan in 1988. The specific epithet (pelinos) means "of clay or mud", referring to the habitat of this species.

Distribution and habitat
This pimelea grows around salt lakes in sandy clay, and is only known from near the type location in the Mallee bioregion of south-western Western Australia.

Conservation status
Pimelea pelinos is listed as "Priority One" by the Government of Western Australia Department of Biodiversity, Conservation and Attractions, meaning that it is known from only one or a few locations which are potentially at risk.

References

pelinos
Malvales of Australia
Flora of Western Australia
Plants described in 1999
Taxa named by Barbara Lynette Rye